HYC could refer to:

 Hok Yau Club (學友社), an NGO in Hong Kong
 Howard Chu, core developer of OpenLDAP
 Hyde Central railway station, a rail station in England
 Hold Your Colour, an album from the band Pendulum
 Harlem Yacht Club
 Wycombe Air Park, which has the IATA code HYC